Deep Impact is a 1998 American science-fiction disaster film directed by Mimi Leder, written by Bruce Joel Rubin and Michael Tolkin, and starring Robert Duvall, Téa Leoni, Elijah Wood, Vanessa Redgrave, Maximilian Schell, and Morgan Freeman. Steven Spielberg served as an executive producer of this film. It was released by Paramount Pictures in North America and by DreamWorks Pictures internationally on May 8, 1998.

Deep Impact was released in the same summer as a similarly themed film, Armageddon, which fared better at the box office, while astronomers described Deep Impact as being more scientifically accurate. Both films were similarly received by critics, with Armageddon scoring 38% and Deep Impact scoring 44% on Rotten Tomatoes. Deep Impact grossed over $349 million worldwide on an $80 million production budget. It was the final film by cinematographer Dietrich Lohmann, who died before the film's release.

Plot

In May 1998, at a star party, teenage amateur astronomer Leo Beiderman observes an unidentified object in the night sky. He sends a picture to astronomer Dr. Marcus Wolf, who realizes it is a comet on collision course with Earth. Wolf dies in a car crash while racing to raise the alarm.

A year later, journalist Jenny Lerner investigates Secretary of the Treasury Alan Rittenhouse over his connection with "Ellie", whom she assumes to be a mistress but is confused when she finds him and his family loading a boat with large amounts of food and other survival gear. She is apprehended by the FBI and taken to meet President Tom Beck, who persuades her not to share the story in return for a prominent role in the press conference he will arrange. She subsequently discovers that "Ellie" is actually an acronym — ELE — which stands for "extinction-level event". Two days later, Beck announces that the comet Wolf–Beiderman is on course to impact the Earth in roughly one year and could cause humanity's extinction. He reveals that the United States and Russia have been constructing the Messiah in orbit, a spacecraft to transport a team to alter the comet's path with nuclear bombs.

The Messiah launches a short time later with a crew of five American astronauts and one Russian cosmonaut. They land on the comet's surface and drill the nuclear bombs deep beneath its surface, but the comet shifts into the sunlight. Consequently, one astronaut is blinded and another propelled into space by an explosive release of gas. The remaining crew escape the comet and detonate the bombs.

Rather than deflect the comet, the bombs split it in two. Beck announces the mission's failure in a television address, and that both pieces — the larger now named Wolf and the smaller named Beiderman — are both still headed for Earth. Martial law is imposed and a lottery selects 800,000 Americans to join 200,000 pre-selected individuals in underground shelters in the Meramec Caverns in Missouri. Lerner is pre-selected, as are the Beiderman family as gratitude for discovering the comet, though Leo's girlfriend Sarah and her family are not selected. Leo marries Sarah in a vain attempt to save her family; while this saves Sarah, her family are still not selected, and she refuses to go without them.

A last-ditch effort to deflect the comets with ICBMs fails. Upon arrival at the shelter, Leo eschews his safety and leaves to find Sarah. He reaches her on the freeway and takes her and her baby brother to high ground while her parents remain. Lerner gives up her seat on the evacuation helicopter to a colleague and her young daughter, and instead travels to the beach where she reconciles with her estranged father.

The Beiderman fragment hits the Atlantic Ocean near Cape Hatteras, North Carolina, creating a megatsunami that destroys much of the East Coast of the United States reaching the Ohio River Valley, also hitting Europe and Africa, resulting in millions of fatalities, including Sarah’s parents, Lerner and her father. Leo, Sarah, and her baby brother survive after making it to the foothills of the Appalachian Mountains. The crew of Messiah decide to sacrifice themselves to destroy the larger Wolf fragment by flying deep inside it and detonating their remaining nuclear bombs. They say goodbye to their loved ones and execute their plan. Wolf is blown into smaller pieces which burn up harmlessly in the Earth's atmosphere.

After the waters recede, President Beck speaks to a large crowd at an under-construction replacement United States Capitol, encouraging them to remember those lost as they begin to rebuild.

Cast

Production
The origins of Deep Impact started in the late 1970s when producers Richard Zanuck and David Brown approached Paramount Pictures proposing a remake of the 1951 film When Worlds Collide. Although several screenplay drafts were completed, the producers were not completely happy with any of them and the project remained in "development hell" for many years. In the mid-1990s, they approached director Steven Spielberg, with whom they had made the 1975 blockbuster Jaws, to discuss their long-planned project. However, Spielberg had already bought the film rights to the 1993 novel The Hammer of God by Arthur C. Clarke, which dealt with a similar theme of an asteroid on a collision course for Earth and humanity's attempts to prevent its own extinction. Spielberg planned to produce and direct The Hammer of God himself for his then-fledgling DreamWorks studio, but opted to merge the two projects with Zanuck and Brown, and they commissioned a screenplay for what would become Deep Impact. In 1995, the forthcoming film was announced in industry publications as "Screenplay by Bruce Joel Rubin, based on the film When Worlds Collide and The Hammer of God by Arthur C Clarke" though ultimately, following a subsequent redraft by Michael Tolkin, neither source work would be credited in the final film. Spielberg still planned to direct Deep Impact himself, but commitments to his 1997 film Amistad prevented him from doing so in time, particularly as Touchstone Pictures had just announced their own similarly-themed film Armageddon, also to be released in summer 1998. Not wanting to wait, the producers opted to hire Mimi Leder to direct Deep Impact, with Spielberg acting as executive producer. Leder was unaware of the other film being made. “I couldn’t believe it. And the press was trying to pit us against each other. That didn’t feel good. Both films have great value and, fortunately, they both succeeded tremendously." Clarke's novel was used as part of the film's publicity campaign both before and after the film's release and he was disgruntled about not being credited on the film.

Jenny Lerner, the character played by Téa Leoni, was originally intended to work for CNN. CNN rejected this because it would be "inappropriate". MSNBC agreed to be featured in the movie instead, seeing it as a way to gain exposure for the then newly created network.

Director Mimi Leder later explained that she would have liked to travel to other countries to incorporate additional perspectives, but due to a strict filming schedule and a comparatively low budget, the idea was scratched. Visual effects supervisor Scott Farrar felt that coverage of worldwide events would have distracted and detracted from the main characters' stories.

A number of scientists worked as science consultants for the film including astronomers Gene Shoemaker, Carolyn Shoemaker, Josh Colwell and Chris Luchini, former astronaut David Walker, and the former director of the NASA's Lyndon B. Johnson Space Center Gerry Griffin.

Soundtrack

The music for the film was composed and conducted by James Horner.

Reception

Box office
Deep Impact debuted at the North American box office with $41 million in ticket sales. It managed to cross over Twister, scoring the tenth-highest opening weekend of all time. For a decade, the film held the record for having the biggest opening weekend for a female-directed film until it was taken by Twilight in 2008. The film grossed $140 million in North America and an additional $209 million worldwide for a total gross of $349 million. Despite competition in the summer of 1998 from the similar Armageddon, both films were widely successful, with Deep Impact being the higher opener of the two, while Armageddon was the most profitable overall.

Critical reception
Deep Impact had a mixed critical reception. Based on 90 reviews collected by Rotten Tomatoes, 44% of critics enjoyed the film, with an average rating of 5.7/10. The website's critical consensus reads, "A tidal wave of melodrama sinks Deep Impacts chance at being the memorable disaster flick it aspires to be." Metacritic gave a score of 40 out of 100 based on 20 reviews, indicating "mixed or average reviews".

Elvis Mitchell of The New York Times said that the film "has a more brooding, thoughtful tone than this genre usually calls for", while Rita Kempley and Michael O'Sullivan of The Washington Post criticized what they saw as unemotional performances and a lack of tension.

At the 1998 Stinkers Bad Movie Awards, the film was nominated for Worst Supporting Actress for Leoni (lost to Lacey Chabert for Lost in Space) and Worst Screenplay For A Film Grossing More Than $100 Million (Using Hollywood Math) (lost to Godzilla).

See also 
 
 
 Greenland (film)

References

External links

 
 
 
 
 

1990s American films
1990s disaster films
1990s English-language films
1998 films
1998 science fiction films
American disaster films
American science fiction films
American survival films
Comets in film
Fiction about near-Earth asteroids
Films about fictional presidents of the United States
Films about tsunamis
Films set in 1998
Films set in 1999
Films set in the Atlantic Ocean
Films set in Missouri
Films set in New York City
Films set in North Carolina
Films set in the White House
Films set in Virginia
Films set in Washington, D.C.
Films about impact events
Paramount Pictures films
DreamWorks Pictures films
Films scored by James Horner
Films directed by Mimi Leder
Films produced by Richard D. Zanuck
Films produced by David Brown
Films with screenplays by Bruce Joel Rubin
Films with screenplays by Michael Tolkin
The Zanuck Company films
Films set in bunkers